Sugbai Island (also spelled Sugbay or Sigboy) is a Philippine island in the Sulu Archipelago between the Sulu Sea and the Celebes Sea. It is in the South Ubian municipality of Tawi-Tawi province. There is a fishing village on its southern shore.

In October 2015, aircraft wreckage was discovered on the island, leading to speculation about it being from a lost flight.

References

External links
 Sugbay Island at OpenStreetMap

Islands of Tawi-Tawi